In category theory, a tetracategory is a weakened definition of a 4-category.

See also 
 Weak n-category
 infinity category

External links 
 Notes on tetracategories by Todd Trimble.

Higher category theory